, Spanish for a hearing or audience, may refer to:

 Real Audiencia, a type of royal court in late medieval Spain and among Spain's colonies 
 Real Audiencia of Manila, in the Spanish East Indies
 Real Audiencia of Mexico, in New Spain
 Real Audiencia of Quito, in Nueva Granada
 Audiencia Nacional of Spain, a Spanish court created in 1977